The Louisiana black bear (Ursus americanus luteolus), one of 16 subspecies of the American black bear, is found in parts of Louisiana, mainly along the Mississippi River Valley and the Atchafalaya River Basin. It was classified as 'threatened' under the U.S. Endangered Species Act from 1992-2016. The validity of this subspecies has been repeatedly debated.

Description
The subspecies does not have a substantially different appearance than the nominate U. americanus americanus, but the skull is relatively long, narrow and flat and the molars are proportionately large. The fur color is usually black, but a cinnamon phase is known to exist.

Distribution and habitat
The Louisiana black bear historically occurred in Louisiana, Mississippi, East Texas and Arkansas.

Four areas are currently known to have populations of the black bear:
St. Mary Parish and Iberia Parish in south Louisiana,
Pointe Coupee Parish in central Louisiana,
the Richard K. Yancey Wildlife Management Area in Concordia and Avoyelles Parishes, in east-central Louisiana
Tensas, Madison, and West Carroll Parishes in northeast Louisiana.

The Louisiana black bear can travel for long distances and has been sighted in many areas of Louisiana not normally considered bear habitat. Occurrences are reported from East Texas and subpopulations have expanded into Mississippi. Black bears have been sighted in Kisatchie National Forest, Allen Parish, Natchitoches Parish, East Baton Rouge, and Bossier City.

Conservation
While the IUCN classifies the conservation situation of the black bear as a species as Least Concern, the Louisiana black bear as a subspecies was listed as 'threatened' under the U.S. Endangered Species Act in 1992. Under this ruling, all bears within the historic range of the Louisiana black bear, from eastern Texas to southern Mississippi, have been protected. On April 11, 2016, this protection of the Louisiana black bear was eliminated as were the related Similarity-of-Appearance Protections for the American black bear.

Loss of habitat was the primary reason the bear was placed on the federal endangered species list. The Louisiana Department of Wildlife and Fisheries and the U.S. Fish and Wildlife Service have acquired land for Wildlife Management Areas and National Wildlife Refuges. Reforestation on private property has been accomplished through U.S.D.A. programs such as the Wetlands Reserve Program and Conservation Reserve Program, the American Forest Foundation, as well as through programs of private conservation organizations such as the Black Bear Conservation Coalition (BBCC), The Nature Conservancy and Ducks Unlimited.

References

American black bears
Carnivorans of North America
Fauna of the Eastern United States
Natural history of Louisiana
Pliocene carnivorans
Quaternary carnivorans
Pliocene mammals of North America
Quaternary mammals of North America
Least concern biota of the United States
Scavengers